Echinocereus is a genus of ribbed, usually small to medium-sized, cylindrical shaped cacti, comprising about 70 species native to the southern United States and Mexico in very sunny, rocky places. Usually the flowers are large and the fruit edible.

The name comes from the Ancient Greek ἐχῖνος (echinos), meaning "hedgehog", and the Latin cereus meaning "candle". They are sometimes known as hedgehog cacti, a term also used for the Pediocactus and Echinopsis.

Description
The species of the genus Echinocereus grow solitary or branching with prostrate to erect shoots that are spherical to cylindrical. The roots are fibrous or bulbous. The plants reach heights of growth between 1 and 60 centimeters. On the tips of the 4 to 26 ribs, which are mostly clear and only rarely resolved into humps, are the areoles, from which differently shaped spines can arise.

The small to large, funnel-shaped flowers arise at the top of an areole or break through the epidermis. They are usually brightly colored and open during the day. Their pericarp and floral tube are studded with thorns, bristles, and sometimes wool. The scar is usually green, but sometimes white in color.

The spherical to ovoid fruits are green to red and mostly thorny. They are mostly juicy and open along a longitudinal slit. The sometimes fragrant fruits contain broadly oval, black, tuberous seeds 0.8 to 2 millimeters long.

Cultivation
Echinocereus spp. are easier to cultivate than many other cacti. They need  light soil, a sunny exposure, and a fresh and dry winter to flower. They grow better in soil slightly richer than other cacti. In the wild, several of the species are cold hardy, tolerating temperatures as low as -23°C, but only in dry conditions.

Species
The following species are recognized in the genus Echinocereus by Plants of the World Online:

Formerly placed here
Echinopsis candicans (Gillies ex Salm-Dyck) F.A.C.Weber ex D.R.Hunt (as E. candicans (Gillies ex Salm-Dyck) Rümpler)

References

Further reading
 Fischer, Pierre C. 70 Common Cacti of the Southwest. City unknown: Southwest Parks and Monuments Association, 1989.
 Anderson, Miles (1998). The Ultimate Book of Cacti and Succulents. . Lorenz Books.
 Innes C, Wall B (1995). Cacti' Succulents and Bromaliads. Cassell & The Royal Horticultural Society.
 Anderson, Edward F. : "The Cactus Family" (2001)
 Taylor, Nigel P.: The Genus Echinocereus. Kew Magazine Monograph, Timber Press 1985, 
 Blum, Lange, Rischer & Rutow: Echinocereus, (1998)

External links
 
 
 Echinocereus on CactiGuide.com
 Echinocereus Online (in German)
 USDA PLANTS Profile
 

 
Cactoideae genera
Cacti of North America
Entheogens